The NTR National Award is an annual award presented by the Government of Andhra Pradesh to recognize people for their lifetime achievements and contributions to the Cinema of India. The NTR National Award is an honorary Nandi Award in the honour of an Indian Film actor, director, producer, and politician N.T. Rama Rao who also served as the Chief Minister of Andhra Pradesh.  The Award carries a cash prize of  500,000/- and a memento.

Recipients 
The recipients of the awards are as follows:
 1996: Akkineni Nageswara Rao
 1997: Dilip Kumar
 1998: Sivaji Ganesan
 1999: Lata Mangeshkar
 2000: Bhanumathi Ramakrishna
 2001: Hrishikesh Mukherjee
 2002: Dr. Rajkumar
 2003: Ghattamaneni Krishna
 2004: Ilayaraja
 2005: Ambareesh
 2006: Waheeda Rehman
 2007: Dasari Narayana Rao
 2008: Jamuna
 2009: B. Saroja Devi
 2010: Sharada
 2011: Amitabh Bachchan
 2012: S. P. Balasubrahmanyam
 2013: Hema Malini
2014: Kamal Haasan
2015: K. Raghavendra Rao
2016: Rajinikanth

References

Indian film awards
Nandi Awards
Lifetime achievement awards
Memorials to NT Rama Rao